Philippe Marini (born 28 January 1950 in Paris) is a former member of the Senate of France, who represented the Oise department.  He is a member of the Union for a Popular Movement. He is of Italian origin.

From September 1992, Senator Marini was an influential senator, focusing on many issues related to banking and international finance.  Marini holds a law degree, and is considered an expert on French and international financial matters.  Prior to public service as an elected leader in France, Senator Marini was a professor at several universities.  A long-term member of UMP, Marini has been an active participant in preparing the economic reform plan of a fellow UMP member, French President Nicolas Sarkozy.

References
Page on the Senate website

1950 births
Living people
Politicians from Paris
French people of Corsican descent
Rally for the Republic politicians
The Republicans (France) politicians
The Popular Right
French Senators of the Fifth Republic
Mayors of places in Hauts-de-France
Senators of Oise
Lycée Condorcet alumni
Sciences Po alumni
Paris 2 Panthéon-Assas University alumni
École nationale d'administration alumni
Inspection générale des finances (France)